Daphoenictis is an extinct cat-like genus of the family Amphicyonidae (bear-dogs), subfamily Daphoeninae, endemic to North America during the Late Eocene subepoch (37.2-33.9 million years ago), existing for approximately 3.3 million years. Daphoenictis geographical range was mid-western North America; from  central Canada, to Texas, U.S. Only one species is known, Daphoenictis tedfordi.

References
Larry D. Martin."Fossil history of terrestrial Carnivora". In John Gittleman,ed.,Carnivore Behavior,Ecology and Evolution, 1989,pp. 558–559.

Bear dogs
Paleogene mammals of North America
Prehistoric carnivoran genera